The Klamath River is a river in southern Oregon and northern California in the United States. This article describes its course.

Oregon

The Klamath River's drainage basin above Upper Klamath Lake is fed primarily by the Williamson River and the Sprague River, which stretch into south-central Oregon east of the Cascades.
Above Upper Klamath Lake, several streams drain south and southeast from the Cascades to form Agency Lake, which is connected to Upper Klamath Lake. After flowing out of the Bureau of Reclamation-built dam, the river flows into a  stretch known as the Link River, past the city of Klamath Falls and into Lake Ewauna, a -long reservoir. The Lost River enters from the left via a series of agricultural ditches and canals (formerly, all of its water emptied into Tule Lake). It crosses under Oregon State Route 97 twice, once upstream of and once downstream of Oregon Route 140, and continues west through an agricultural valley to Keno. At Keno the river veers sharply south and passes through the Keno Dam, which forms Lake Ewauna,  from the mouth,
passing the now-drained Lower Klamath Lake.

The Klamath enters a narrow gorge and runs northeast, then enters the J.C. Boyle Reservoir, formed by the John C. Boyle Dam, and passes through the gates of the dam  from the mouth. After flowing a few miles through this narrow gorge, it widens into a rugged valley and turns west-southwest, crossing the Oregon-California border. Butte Creek comes in from the south. After crossing the border, the river turns sharply south, diverges around a small island, and receives Edge Creek from the right. The river then flows into Copco Lake, formed by the Copco Dam. Exiting the dam  from the mouth, the river bends sharply north then south around a ridge and receives Fall Creek from the right as it passes the town of Copco. There are proposals to remove all four dams by 2020.

Far northern California
The river then enters Iron Gate Reservoir,  from the mouth. The reservoir bends south and the Klamath flows away through Iron Gate Dam,  from the mouth. The river then swings west and passes through an arid valley used for farming and ranching. Near Hornbrook the river receives Hutton Creek from the right and turns sharply south as it meets Interstate 5.The river then veers west again as it receives the Shasta River, which flows north from the Mount Shasta area, from the left.

Flowing through its narrow canyon, the river receives Beaver Creek from the right,  from the mouth, as it passes the small hamlet of Klamath River from the south. It then turns west, and with the massive bulk of Dry Lake Mountain looming to the north, the river receives Horse Creek from the right after passing the town of the same name. It then turns south and then west, whipsawing through an increasingly narrow gorge, and receives the Scott River from the left and passes Hamburg,  from the mouth. The river then passes Seiad Valley and receives Seiad Creek from the right and Grider Creek from the left,  from the mouth. The river then enters another narrower gorge and passes Fort Goff before dropping over a series of rapids.

The river rounds a bend southward, then twists sharply northward, southwest and southeast around a ridge as it receives China Creek from the left,  from the mouth. The river then again bends southwest, then curves northward, diverges around two islands, then swings east and finally southwest around another ridge as it enters a wider valley and passes the town of Happy Camp,  from the mouth. Receiving wide, shallow Indian Creek from the right, the Klamath then bends southwest into a narrow gorge, still paralleling State Route 96. The river passes Clear Creek  from the mouth and receives the creek of the same name as it begins to flow south-southeast; a little farther on, it receives Independence Creek from the left, then bends west as it receives King Creek from the left.

Now incised into a narrow channel and meandering around sandbars and gravel bars, the river drops over rapid after rapid and turns south as it receives Dillon Creek from the right,  from the mouth. Ti Creek enters from the left and Rock Creek from the right as the river continues to flow south through a steep and narrow gorge, cutting through the Cascade Range itself. [Cascades appear upstream from here. This is either way-south Siskyous or Coast Range.] The valley of the Klamath gradually transitions from an arid high desert to a temperate rainforest climate. [NOTE: THE MILEAGES FROM HERE ON ARE ALL MUCH TOO LOW; FOR EXAMPLE, BLUFF CREEK IS ABOUT 52 MILES FROM THE MOUTH.]  It drops over Ishi Pishi Falls, a historical Native American fishing spot, and receives the Salmon River, its most powerful tributary thus far, from the left,  from the mouth. Here it rounds a small ridge, then turns southwest and passes the town of Orleans,  from the mouth. The river then bends north, west and south around another ridge, receives Boise Creek from the left and Slate Creek and Bluff Creek from the right,  from the mouth.

Weitchpec to mouth
The Klamath rounds a northerly bend around Burrill Peak, passing Weitchpec as it turns northwestward on the beginning of its final run to the sea. At Weitchpec, the river receives its largest and most important tributary, the Trinity River, from the south (left),  from the mouth. A vital contributor to the flow of the lower Klamath, the Trinity drains  in the Cascade Range south of the Klamath and Salmon rivers. More than 90 percent of its flow is diverted at Trinity Lake - leaving the most important tributaries below the dam, the North Fork, South Fork, and the New River to replenish it. At Weitchpec, State Route 96 turns away from the Klamath and runs south up the Trinity, and its role along the Klamath is replaced by California State Route 169. After collecting the Trinity, the Klamath turns north-northwest and receives Pine Creek and Tully Creek from the left.

Twisting westwards, then again north, the Klamath passes the town of Johnsons,  from the mouth. State Route 169 terminates at Johnsons, and for the remainder of its course, the Klamath flows through a wild canyon nearly untouched by human intervention. It diverges around a large sandy island, and receives Ah Pah Creek from the left and Blue Creek from the right,  from the mouth. This area was originally intended to be the site of a massive storage dam, Ah Pah Dam. The river flows north through an increasingly wide valley, then passes the town of Klamath Glen, where State Route 169 resumes. The river meanders north and then veers west, crossing under U.S. Highway 101 and passing the towns of Klamath and Requa. All three towns are on the right bank of the river.

Much of the middle course of the river in California is within the Klamath National Forest. The lower course of the river, in northern Humboldt County and southern Del Norte County, passes through the homeland of the Karuk Tribe and the Yurok Indian Reservation. An  stretch of the river in Oregon south of Klamath Falls to the California–Oregon border, including the Hell's Corner Gorge, has been designated as the Klamath Wild and Scenic River.

See also
 Klamath River
 Klamath Project, the set of United States Bureau of Reclamation dams on upstream tributaries of the Klamath, primarily for agricultural water storage
 Klamath River Hydroelectric Project, the set of privately owned dams on the mainstem of the Klamath, some of which are targeted for removal
 River of Renewal: Myth and History in the Klamath Basin (book)

References

Works cited
Palmer, Tim (1993). The wild and scenic rivers of America. Island Press. .
U.S. Coast and Geodetic Survey (UCGS, 1951). United States Coast Pilot. University of California.
Board on Environmental Studies and Toxicology (BEST); Water Science and Technology Board (WSTB), 2008. Hydrology, Ecology and Fishes of the Klamath River Basin. National Academies Press.

External links
 Mid Klamath Watershed Council
 COPCO LAKE HOME PAGE KLAMATH RIVER IRONGATE LAKE KLAMATH DAMS

Course